Albert A. Hale (March 13, 1950 – February 2, 2021) was an American attorney and politician. A member of the Democratic Party, he served in the Arizona Senate from 2004 to 2011 and in the Arizona House of Representatives from 2011 to 2017.

A member of the Navajo Nation, Hale was elected as the tribe's president in 1994. He served until 1998, when he resigned to avoid facing prosecution for 50 felonies and misdemeanors related to theft and bribery. He was widely recognized as a staunch advocate for tribal rights and a key figure in upholding tribal sovereignty.

Early life and education
Albert A. Hale was born on March 13, 1950, in Ganado, Arizona, to Willie, who worked at the Fort Wingate U.S. Army depot, and Irene, who herded sheep. He was raised in Klagetsoh, and was of the  clan. His family lived at the depot when he was born. Willie was beaten to death in a jail in Gallup, New Mexico, by a police officer when Albert was two years old. The officer did not face any repercussions. According to Hale's daughter April, his father's killing is the event that inspired him to enter politics.

He attended Wingate High School, and frequently told a story of Navajo Nation Council member Annie Dodge Wauneka shaming him into going to school after he was caught being truant.

Hale earned a Bachelor of Science degree from Arizona State University and a Juris Doctor from the University of New Mexico School of Law.

Career

Legal work 
Hale began his legal career in private practice. He served as a judge pro tempore in the Laguna Pueblo, and later served as both assistant attorney general of and special counsel to the Navajo Nation Council. He served as the president of both the Navajo Nation Bar Association and the State Bar of New Mexico.

Politics
Hale was elected the second Navajo Nation President in late 1994, running on a campaign of local empowerment. His intention was to move more powers to the local 110 chapters of government in the Nation. A leader with a national reputation, Hale had become known for his promotion of tribal sovereignty. Ron Allen, president of the National Congress of American Indians, said that he worked to "explain to Congress and the President and the rest of the world that we are Indian governments, not just tribes." The New York Times described him as "one of the most forceful advocates for the rights of tribes as nations within a nation." In February 1998, Speaker of the U.S. House of Representatives Newt Gingrich told a group of Indian leaders, including Hale, that he was confused by tribal sovereignty, to which Hale reportedly responded, "When I come to Washington, you don't send me to the Bureau of Indian Affairs. You have a state dinner for me."

In 1997, The Navajo Times published articles reporting "alleged misuse of a tribal credit card" and elements of his personal life. The Navajo attorney general appointed a special prosecutor, who investigated for five months Hale's spending in 1995 and 1996. He was indicted in 1997 for accepting kickbacks and bribes, and for misuse of government property. The High Country Times also reported that he had an extramarital affair. He was allowed to resign his post on February 19, 1998, to avoid criminal prosecution on 50 counts.

Hale re-entered electoral politics in January 2004, when Governor Janet Napolitano appointed him to fill the Arizona Senate seat from the 2nd district vacated by Jack Jackson Sr.

In 2011, after being restricted from running in the Senate again by term limits, he was elected to the Arizona House of Representatives. There, he advocated for tribal nations to receive more tax revenue from the transaction privilege tax and for compensation for uranium mining on Navajo land.

Hale also served as chairman of the Navajo Nation Water Rights Commission, where he played an important role in negotiating a settlement with the New Mexico government over the San Juan Basin, which resulted in more water for many Navajo communities.

Personal life and death
Hale was married three times, with the first two ending in divorce. Hale was known by many in the Navajo community as "Abhihay". According to Jack Jackson Jr., Hale commanded respect, and was known for wearing a Navajo warrior hat known as an atsá cha’h at important events.

On November 22, 2014, Hale was arrested on suspicion of driving under the influence by the Arizona Department of Public Safety. He was booked into the Navajo County jail in Holbrook, Arizona, and released the same day.

Hale was hospitalized in Mesa, Arizona, after testing positive for COVID-19 in early January 2021. He died from complications related to the virus on February 2, 2021, at age 70. He is survived by nine children and his wife, Paula.

After his death, Navajo Nation Council Speaker Seth Damon recognized Hale on behalf of the council, saying "he is remembered for his service and dedication to the Navajo people, which continued beyond the borders of the Nation when he was called to represent our district in the Arizona Legislature. We recognize his positive contributions to the development of numerous initiatives that have advanced the causes of Navajo people both at home and abroad." President of the Navajo Nation Jonathan Nez and Governor of Arizona Doug Ducey both ordered flags to be flown at half-staff in honor of him.

References

External links
 Senator Albert Hale – District 2 , official State Senate website
 Profile at Project Vote Smart
 Follow the Money – Albert Hale
 2008 2006 2004 campaign contributions
 

1950 births
2021 deaths
20th-century American lawyers
20th-century American politicians
21st-century American politicians
20th-century Native Americans
21st-century Native Americans
Arizona lawyers
Democratic Party Arizona state senators
Deaths from the COVID-19 pandemic in Arizona
Democratic Party members of the Arizona House of Representatives
Native American state legislators in Arizona
Navajo Nation politicians
People from Ganado, Arizona
Presidents of the Navajo Nation
University of Arizona alumni
University of New Mexico School of Law alumni
Native American people from Arizona